Croker's Hole is a  biological Site of Special Scientific Interest north of Upper Lambourn in Berkshire.

The site is a narrow grassland valley, which is one of the most florally diverse chalk downlands in Berkshire. The dominant plants are upright brome and tor-grass, and it is the only site in the county which has the nationally scarce bastard toadflax.

There is access from a footpath from Seven Barrows to Hangman's Stone.

References

Sites of Special Scientific Interest in Berkshire
Lambourn